Moelleriopsis is a genus of sea snails, marine gastropod mollusks unassigned in the superfamily Seguenzioidea.

Description
The small shell of these deep-water species is relatively thin. It is white under a golden brown or olive brown epidermis. It contains few, convex whorls, forming an elevated spire and large body whorl. The suture is distinct. The round and deep umbilicus has a moderate size, showing some of the whorls. The circular aperture is slightly oblique. The peristome is continuous with a thin, sharp edge, appearing thickened within. It is attached to the body whorl only for a short distance.

Species
Species within the genus Moelleriopsis include:
 Moelleriopsis abyssicola Bush, 1897
 Moelleriopsis atlantis Hoffman, Gofas & Freiwald, 2020
 †Moelleriopsis carinaspira Lozouet, 1999
 Moelleriopsis gritta Hoffman in Hoffman, Gofas & Freiwald, 2020
 Moelleriopsis messanensis (Seguenza, 1876)
 Moelleriopsis meteorminora Hoffman, Gofas & Freiwald, 2020
 Moelleriopsis nipponica (Okutani, 1964)
 Moelleriopsis normani (Dautzenberg & H. Fischer, 1897)
 Moelleriopsis poppei Engl, 2012
 Moelleriopsis richardi (Dautzenberg & H. Fischer, 1896)
 Moelleriopsis sincera (Dall, 1890)
 Moelleriopsis valvatoides (Jeffreys, 1883)
 Moelleriopsis vemae (Clarke, 1961)
 Moelleriopsis watsoni (Tryon, 1888)

Species brought into synonymy
 Moelleriopsis valvatoides (Jeffreys, 1883): synonym of Skenea valvatoides (Jeffreys, 1883)

References

 Gofas, S.; Le Renard, J.; Bouchet, P. (2001). Mollusca, in: Costello, M.J. et al. (Ed.) (2001). European register of marine species: a check-list of the marine species in Europe and a bibliography of guides to their identification. Collection Patrimoines Naturels, 50: pp. 180–213
 Spencer, H.; Marshall. B. (2009). All Mollusca except Opisthobranchia. In: Gordon, D. (Ed.) (2009). New Zealand Inventory of Biodiversity. Volume One: Kingdom Animalia. 584 pp

External links
 Bush, K. (1897). Revision of the marine gastropods referred to Cyclostrema, Adeorbis, Vitrinella and related genera with decriptions of some new genera and species belonging to the Atlantic fauna of America. Transactions of the Connecticut Academy of Arts and Sciences. 10: 97-144.
 Clarke, A. H. (1961). Abyssal mollusks from the South Atlantic Ocean. Bulletin of the Museum of Comparative Zoology. 4, 345-387
  Serge GOFAS, Ángel A. LUQUE, Joan Daniel OLIVER,José TEMPLADO & Alberto SERRA (2021) - The Mollusca of Galicia Bank (NE Atlantic Ocean); European Journal of Taxonomy 785: 1–114</ref>